Boy with Lots of Brass is a 1957 album by Canadian jazz trumpeter Maynard Ferguson featuring singer Irene Kral.

Reception

Allmusic awarded the album three stars with reviewer Scott Yanow stating that the arrangements "show off the talented orchestra and its memorable leader quite well."

Track listing
 "Give Me the Simple Life" (Rube Bloom, Harry Ruby) - 2:34
 "My Funny Valentine" (Lorenz Hart, Richard Rodgers) - 4:00
 "The Lamp Is Low" (Peter DeRose, Bert Shefter) - 3:24
 "Imagination" (Jimmy Van Heusen) - 3:55
 "The Song Is You" (Jerome Kern, Oscar Hammerstein II) - 2:10
 "Jeepers Creepers" (Harry Warren, Johnny Mercer) - 2:32
 "Love Me or Leave Me" (Walter Donaldson, Gus Kahn) - 2:44
 "A Foggy Day" (George Gershwin, Ira Gershwin) - 3:02
 "Easy to Love" (Cole Porter) - 3:10
 "Moonlight in Vermont" (John Blackburn, Karl Suessdorf) - 3:49
 "I Hadn't Anyone Till You" (Ray Noble) - 1:42
 "I Never Knew" (Ted Fio Rito, Kahn) - 3:08

Personnel 
Maynard Ferguson - trumpet, valve trombone
Willie Maiden - arranger, tenor saxophone
Al Cohn - arranger
Bill Holman
Ernie Wilkins
Irene Kral - vocals
Anthony Ortega - alto saxophone
Tate Houston - baritone saxophone
Jimmy Cleveland - trombone
Jimmy Knepper - trombone
John Bello - trumpet
Joe Burnett
Bobby Timmons - piano
Richard Evans - bass
Larry Bunker - drums
Jordi Pujol - reissue producer

References 

1957 albums
Maynard Ferguson albums
EmArcy Records albums